Ronnie Burrell (born July 21, 1983) is an American former professional basketball player who is currently the head coach of the Long Island Nets, the NBA G League affiliate of the Brooklyn Nets.

Early life
Born in 1983, Burrell played high school basketball at Montclair High School, in Montclair, New Jersey.

College career
Burrell played college basketball at UNC Greensboro, from 2001 to 2005, with the UNC Greensboro Spartans. He played under the team's head coach at that time, Fran McCaffery. During his college career, he was an All-Southern Conference Team selection in 2004 and 2005.

Professional career
Burrell played with the WBA's Gainesville Knights, in 2005. Burrell then moved to Europe, and signed with the French club Levallois SCB for the 2005–06 season. The following season, he signed with RheinEnergie Koln, where he won the German Cup. He played in the NBA Summer League with the Seattle SuperSonics's summer league squad for two summers. After that, he played with the German club Telekom Baskets Bonn, and the Polish club Asseco Prokom Sopot/Gdynia. With Gdynia, he also won three Polish League championships. Burrell played in 55 EuroLeague games, and he made it to the EuroLeague's quarterfinals in the 2009–10 season.

In 2011, he signed a contract with the German club EWE Baskets Oldenburg. In July 2013, he signed with the German club BBC Bayreuth. In September 2015, he signed a contract with the French club Orchies. He signed with the French club Lille Métropole, in February 2016. Burrell retired from playing pro club basketball in April 2016, due to an injury.

Coaching career
On September 20, 2019, Burrell was hired as an assistant coach by the Long Island Nets, the NBA Development League affiliate of the NBA club the Brooklyn Nets.

On November 14, 2020 he was hired as player development coach with the Chicago Bulls.

In September 2022, Burrell became head coach of  Long Island Nets, the G League affiliate of the NBA's Brooklyn Nets. He was named Coach of the Month by the G League for both January and February of 2023, making him only the fourth coach to win back-to-back Coach of the Month honors in G League history.

References

External links
EuroLeague Profile
RealGM.com Profile

1983 births
Living people
American expatriate basketball people in France
American expatriate basketball people in Germany
American expatriate basketball people in Poland
American men's basketball coaches
American men's basketball players
Asseco Gdynia players
Basketball players from New Jersey
EWE Baskets Oldenburg players
Köln 99ers players
Levallois Sporting Club Basket players
Lille Métropole BC players
Medi Bayreuth players
People from Montclair, New Jersey
Power forwards (basketball)
Small forwards
Sportspeople from Essex County, New Jersey
Telekom Baskets Bonn players
UNC Greensboro Spartans men's basketball players